Miguel Alberto Barreto (born 14 September 1978 in Tostado, Santa Fe) is an Argentine football striker.

External links
 Miguel Barreto at BDFA.com.ar 

1978 births
Living people
People from Nueve de Julio Department, Santa Fe
Argentine footballers
Argentine expatriate footballers
Paykan F.C. players
Instituto footballers
Unión de Santa Fe footballers
Atlético Tucumán footballers
Central Córdoba de Rosario footballers
Montevideo Wanderers F.C. players
Persian Gulf Pro League players
Expatriate footballers in Iran
Expatriate footballers in Uruguay
Expatriate footballers in Hong Kong
Association football forwards
Sportspeople from Santa Fe Province